The Weather Underground Organization (WUO), whose members were often called Weatherman, was a radical leftist organization founded in 1969 and active through 1980. The following is a list of some of the members of Weatherman.

Members

Jane Alpert
William Charles Anderson †
Karen Ashley
Bill Ayers
Rick Ayers
Kit Bakke
Silas Bissell †
Kathy Boudin †
Scott Braley
Judith Clark
Bernardine Dohrn
Jennifer Dohrn, sister of Bernardine and supporter
Dianne Donghi
Linda Sue Evans
Brian Flanagan
Ron Fliegelman
David Gilbert
Ted Gold †
Larry Grathwohl †
Phoebe Hirsch
John Jacobs †
Naomi Jaffe
Jeff Jones
Michael Justesen
Nancy Kurshan
Clayton Van Lydegraf †
Howard Machtinger
Eric Mann
Charlotte Massey
Douglas Murdock
Mark D. Naison
Diana Oughton †
 Marc Curtis Perry 
Eleanor Raskin, nee Stein
Jonah Raskin
 Michael "Mike" Reilly †
Terry Robbins †
Susan Rosenberg
Robert Roth
Mark Rudd
Nancy Rudd
Kenneth "Kenny" Schlosser
 Michael "Mike" Spiegel
Matthew Steen
Annie Stein †
Susan Stern †
Caroline Tanker
Laura Whitehorn
Cathy Wilkerson
Jane Ann White

† Deceased.

The above list includes some people who were connected with Weatherman (the above-ground political grouping that preceded the Weather Underground Organization) but did not go underground to join the WUO.

References

Weatherman
Weatherman
Members of the Weather Underground